Pablo Sebastián Adasme (born 25 October 1993) is an Argentine footballer who plays as a goalkeeper for Rincón del Atuel.

Career
Adasme was formed in the academy of Rincón del Atuel, leaving the club at the age of fourteen to join Independiente Rivadavia. He was loaned out in 2014 to Huracán, therefore rejecting a move to Atlético Pilares, making four appearances for Huracán. A loan with fellow Torneo Federal B side Racing de Olavarría followed, where he featured seven times as they suffered relegation. He returned to his parent club in January 2016, but immediately agreed a two-season loan with Estudiantes of Primera B Nacional. He made his professional debut on 12 November against All Boys, which was one of nine games.

Having been an unused substitute twenty-three times without playing for Independiente Rivadavia during the 2017–18 campaign, Adasme departed permanently on 15 August 2018 to rejoin Rincón del Atuel.

Career statistics
.

References

External links

1993 births
Living people
Sportspeople from Mendoza Province
Argentine footballers
Association football goalkeepers
Primera Nacional players
Independiente Rivadavia footballers
Huracán de San Rafael players
Racing de Olavarría footballers
Club Sportivo Estudiantes players